Vladimir Nikolov Savov (born 12 June 1932) is a Bulgarian weightlifter. He competed in the men's middle heavyweight event at the 1960 Summer Olympics.

References

External links

1932 births
Living people
Bulgarian male weightlifters
Olympic weightlifters of Bulgaria
Weightlifters at the 1960 Summer Olympics
People from Lom, Bulgaria